Michael J. Colletta (September 1, 1924 - January 24, 2007) was a businessman and Republican politician in the U.S. state of Alaska.  He served two terms in the Alaska Senate during the mid and late 1970s, culminating with being the Republican nominee for lieutenant governor, running alongside Tom Fink in the 1982 election.

References

2007 deaths
1920s births
Year of birth uncertain
Republican Party Alaska state senators
Businesspeople from Anchorage, Alaska
Republican Party members of the Alaska House of Representatives
Politicians from Anchorage, Alaska
20th-century American politicians
20th-century American businesspeople